Anton Ildusovich Gafarov (born 4 February 1987) is a Russian cross-country skier who competed between 2008 and 2020. His best World Cup finish was second in a sprint event at Rukatunturi in November 2013.

Gafarov also finished 42nd in the sprint event at the FIS Nordic World Ski Championships 2009 in Liberec.

Cross-country skiing results
All results are sourced from the International Ski Federation (FIS).

Olympic Games

World Championships

World Cup

Season standings

Individual podiums
 2 podiums – (1 , 1 )

References

External links

1987 births
Living people
Russian male cross-country skiers
Olympic cross-country skiers of Russia
Cross-country skiers at the 2014 Winter Olympics
Universiade medalists in cross-country skiing
Universiade gold medalists for Russia
Universiade silver medalists for Russia
Competitors at the 2015 Winter Universiade